PEN/Open Book (known as the Beyond Margins Award through 2009) is a program intended to foster racial and ethnic diversity within the literary and publishing communities, and works to establish access for diverse literary groups to the publishing industry. Created in 1991 by the PEN American Center (today PEN America), the PEN/Open Book program ensures custodians of language and literature are representative of the American people.

The Committee discusses mutual concerns and strategies for advancing writing and professional activities, and coordinates Open Book events. While multiple awards were presented in previous years, the PEN Open Book Award now presents one award every year to books published in the United States (but without citizenship or residency requirements) by "authors of color who have not received wide media coverage".

The award is one of many PEN awards sponsored by International PEN affiliates in over 145 PEN centers around the world. The PEN American Center awards have been characterized as being among the "major" American literary prizes.

Honorees

PEN/Open Book Award 
After 2010, the Beyond Margins Award was renamed the PEN/Open Book Award.

Beyond Margins Award 
Prior to 2010, the PEN Open Book Award was referred to as the Beyond Margins Award, and several books were selected per year as joint winners.

References

External links
PEN Open Book Award Official site

PEN America awards
Awards established in 1991
1991 establishments in the United States
Literary awards honoring minority groups
English-language literary awards